Geocolus is a genus of clown beetles in the family Histeridae. There is one described species in Geocolus, G. caecus.

References

Further reading

 
 

Histeridae
Articles created by Qbugbot